Mill Creek is a tributary of Neshaminy Creek rising in Upper Southampton Township in Bucks County, Pennsylvania, United States. It is one of at least six creeks in Bucks County bearing the same name. The upper portion of Mill Creek was formerly known as Broad Axe Creek.

Statistics
Mill Creek rises near the intersection of Pennsylvania Route 232 and Bristol Road in Upper Southampton, travels through the northern corner of Lower Southampton Township, then easterly through the lower part of Northampton Township where it meets Neshaminy Creek at the latter's 11.25 river mile.

Pennsylvania Department of Environmental Protection designation is 02519.

US Geological Survey designation is 1192933.

Tributaries
Pine Run
Ironworks Creek

Geology
Appalachian Highlands Division
Piedmont Province
Gettysburg-Newark Lowland Section
Stockton Formation
Mill Creek lies in the Stockton Formation, a sedimentary layer of rock laid down during the Triassic. Mineralogy includes coarse-grained arkosic and other sandstone, shale, siltstone, and mudstone. Mill Creek meets the Neshaminy at the Fall Line between the Piedmont Province and the Atlantic Coastal Plain.

Municipalities
Northampton Township
Lower Southampton Township
Upper Southampton Township

Crossings and bridges

See also
List of rivers of Pennsylvania
List of rivers of the United States
List of Delaware River tributaries

References

Rivers of Pennsylvania
Rivers of Bucks County, Pennsylvania
Tributaries of the Neshaminy Creek